NMMP may refer to:
 United States Navy Marine Mammal Program
 New Mexico Mounted Patrol